is a railway station in Abira, Hokkaido, Japan, operated by Hokkaido Railway Company (JR Hokkaido). The station is numbered K15.

Lines
Oiwake Station is served by the Muroran Main Line and Sekishō Line.

Station layout
The station has two ground-level platforms serving four tracks. The station has a "Midori no Madoguchi" staffed ticket office. The Kitaca farecard cannot be used at this station.

Platforms

History
The station opened on 1 November 1892. With the privatization of Japanese National Railways (JNR) on 1 April 1987, the station came under the control of JR Hokkaido.

See also
 List of railway stations in Japan

References

Railway stations in Hokkaido Prefecture
Stations of Hokkaido Railway Company
Railway stations in Japan opened in 1892